James Spenceley (born September 1976) is an Australian investor, entrepreneur and company director. He is the founder of Vocus Communications (now Vocus Group) and an active Venture Capital investor. He is also the Chairman of Airtasker (ASX:ART) and a Non-Executive Director of Kogan.com (ASX:KGN) as well as ASX listed Think Childcare Limited (ASX:TNK).

He has been recognised for his business achievements by twice winning the Ernst and Young Australian Entrepreneur of the year award (young and listed categories) and in 2018 was inducted to the Telecommunications Industry Hall of Fame.

Spenceley is most widely known for his role as the founder and former CEO of Australia's 4th largest fixed line telecommunications company Vocus Communications. On June 25, 2021 Vocus was acquired by Macquarie Infrastructure and Real Assets (MIRA) and Aware Super for $3.5 billion.

Spenceley started Vocus in September 2007 when he sold his house to initially fund the business. The company listed on the Australian Stock Exchange (ASX) in 2010. When he stepped down as CEO of Vocus in March 2016 the company had revenues of greater than $1.8 billion.

In 2016 Spenceley was listed at number 51 of Financial Review Rich List of 100 wealthiest Australian's under 40 with a net worth of $51 million.

Spenceley purchased the Wollongong Hawks (now Illawarra Hawks) NBL basketball team in July 2014 right before the start of the 2014/2015 season. In October 2014, he laid out his plan to win a Grand Final within 3 years. The team finished last in the 2014/2015 season, 4th in the 2015/2016 season and was runner up in the 2016/2017 season losing in the Grand Final to the Perth Wildcats. In February 2018, Spenceley announced he had sold his interest in the Illawarra Hawks.

In early 2021 the Australian Financial Review reported that Spenceley was preparing to list the wireless Telco Swoop Telecom on the ASX with the backing of Tatterang, the family office of one of Australia's richest people Andrew Forrest. The business listed on the ASX under the code SWP raising $20m and was up 150% on its first day of trading.

He is an active Venture Capital investor, with investments in the marketplace business Airtasker where he is now chairman of the board, Beforepay,  Spaceship Financial Services, ASX Listed Buy Now Pay Later business Splitit (ASX:SPT) meal kit delivery service Marley Spoon (ASX:MMM), MoneyMe (ASX:MME) the online consumer lender which listed on the ASX in December 2019 and indoor vertical farming startup Sustenir.

In 2017 and 2018 he was a national judge for the Australian Ernst & Young Entrepreneur of the Year Award.

Spenceley announced in June 2021 that he was running as an independent for a position on North Sydney Council at the upcoming Local Government election. At the subsequent election held on 4 December 2021, Spenceley was elected in first position as a Councillor for St Leonards Ward of North Sydney Council.

Awards 
2018 Voted by the Daily Telegraph newspaper as 11th most influential person on Sydney's North Shore
2018 Inducted to the Telecommunications Hall of Fame
2016 BRW Young Rich List with a reported net wealth of $51m
2015 Ernst & Young Australian Entrepreneur of the Year Winner (Listed)
2015 Ranked #8 AFR CEO's who deliver list
2013 Ranked #81 BRW Young Rich List
2011 Debuted at #91 on BRW Young Rich List
2010 Ernst & Young Australian Entrepreneur of the Year Winner (Young)

References 

1976 births
Living people
Australian business executives
People from Melbourne
Venture capitalists
Sports owners
Independent politicians in Australia
North Sydney Council
New South Wales local councillors